Polypedilum is a genus of non-biting midges in the subfamily Chironominae of the bloodworm family Chironomidae. This is probably the most species-rich of all chironomid genera. Larvae of Polypedilum may also be among the most abundant invertebrates in eutrophic ponds, reaching densities of up to 1200 larvae per square meter.

Species
Subgenus Cerobregma Zhang & Wang 1999
P. paucisetum Zhang & Wang, 2009)
Subgenus Pentapedilum Kieffer, 1913
P. botiense Oyewo & Sæther, 2008
P. scirpicola (Kieffer, 1921)
P. botosaneanui Oyewo & Sæther, 2008
P. camposense Oyewo & Sæther, 2008
P. exsectum (Kieffer, 1916)
P. intuber Oyewo & Sæther, 2008
P. nubens (Edwards, 1929)
P. reei Oyewo & Sæther, 2008
P. sordens (van der Wulp, 1874)
P. tissamaharense Oyewo & Sæther, 2008
P. tritum (Walker, 1856)
P. wittei (Freeman, 1955)
Subgenus Polypedilum Kieffer, 1912
P. acutum Kieffer, 1915
P. albicorne (Meigen, 1838)
P. albosignatum Kieffer, 1925
P. amoenum Goetghebuer, 1930
P. arundineti (Goetghebuer, 1921)
P. barboyoni Serra-Tosio, 1981
P. dudichi Berczik, 1957
P. fallax (Johannsen, 1905)
P. intermedium Albu & Botnariuc, 1966
P. laetum (Meigen, 1818)
P. lene (Becker, 1908)
P. nubeculosum (Meigen, 1804)
P. nubifer (Skuse, 1889)
P. octopunctatum (Thunberg, 1784)
P. pedestre (Meigen, 1830)
P. vanderplanki Hinton, 1951
Subgenus Probolum Anderson & Sæther, 2010
P. marcondesi Pinho & Mendes, 2010
P. excelsius Townes sensu Grodhaus & Rotramel, 1980
P. simantokeleum Sasa, Suzuki & Sakai, 1998
P. bullum Zhang & Wang, 2004
possibly Polypedilum longinervis (Kieffer, 1922)
possibly Polypedilum (Uresipedilum) excelsius Townes, 1945
Subgenus Tripodura Townes, 1945
P. acifer Townes, 1945
P. aegyptium Kieffer, 1925
P. akani Bjørlo, 2001
P. amplificatus Bjørlo, 2001
P. amputatum Bjørlo, 2001
P. apfelbecki (Strobl, 1900)
P. bicrenatum Kieffer, 1921
P. chelum Vårdal, 2001
P. dagombae Bjørlo, 2001
P. elongatum Albu, 1980
P. ewei Bjørlo, 2001
P. malickianum Cranston, 1989
P. ogoouense Bjørlo, 2001
P. patulum Bjørlo, 2001
P. pulchrum Albu, 1980
P. pullum (Zetterstedt, 1838)
P. quadriguttatum Kieffer, 1921
P. scalaenum (Schrank, 1803)
P. spinalveum Vårdal, 2001
P. tetracrenatum Hirvenoja, 1962
Subgenus Uresipedilum Oyewo & Sæther, 1998
P. convictum (Walker, 1856)
P. cultellatum Goetghebuer, 1931
P. marsafae Ghonaim, Ali & Osheibah, 2005
P. minimum Lin, Qi, Zhang & Wang, 2013

See also
 List of Polypedilum species

References

Chironomidae
Diptera of Europe